Die Son (Afrikaans: "The Sun") is a mixed Afrikaans-language South African tabloid reporting sensational news essentially after the model of British tabloids. It is the South African newspaper with the largest increase in readership in recent years. In the Western Cape province, it appears as a daily; in other provinces, it is a weekly paper. The editorial seat is in Cape Town. 

The publishing house Naspers began to publish Die Son in 2003, after the large success of the English-language tabloid The Daily Sun in Western Cape, first under the title Kaapse Son ("Cape Sun"). The sales figures rose so rapidly that they decided in the same year to expand the sales to the whole of South Africa. In the first half-year (2005) the print run of the daily paper was estimated at 50 000; that on Fridays for the whole of South Africa averaged 220 000 copies. The other Afrikaans-language dailies (also from Naspers), like Die Burger, did not suffer from the dramatic growth of Die Son.

The English-language edition and the mixed Afrikaans edition share most of the content (both news and advertisement), except minor differences such as that the English does not have the Page 3 girl feature.

Distribution areas

Distribution figures

Readership figures

See also
 List of newspapers in South Africa
 Daily Voice, a similar newspaper, also based in Cape Town

References

External links
 Die Son Website
 SAARF Website

Afrikaans-language newspapers
Afrikaner culture in Cape Town
Daily newspapers published in South Africa
Mass media in Cape Town
2003 establishments in South Africa
Publications established in 2003